The Master of Arts in Special Education is a postgraduate academic master's degree awarded by universities in many countries. This degree designed to develop the capabilities and resources of educators of children who require Special education, such as students with an Autism spectrum disorder.

Curriculum structure
The Master of Arts in Special Education is a two-year Master Degree, depending on the program, some may be completed in as little as 18 months.

Topics of study may include:
Applied behavior analysis
 Autism therapies
 Communication and Social Skills
 Developmental disability
 Early childhood intervention
 Evidence-based practice
 Individualized Education Program
 Positive behavior support
 Positive Discipline
 Transition Planning

Institutions with MA Special Education Degree programs
There are a few universities that teach this course of study, and the number is continuing to grow. Here is a list of the institutions that have Masters of Arts in Special Education Degree Program:
Ball State University
University of Rhode Island
University of St. Thomas (Minnesota)
San Francisco State University

See also
List of master's degrees
Master of Education

References

Special education
Master's degrees